Hand gestures are used in regions of Italy and in the Italian language as a form of nonverbal communication and expression. The gestures within the Italian lexicon are dominated by movements of the hands and fingers, but may also include movements of facial features such as eyebrows and the mouth. Theories persist as to the exact origin of hand gestures as a method of communication in Italy, however it is likely that they emerged through necessity as a universal, non-verbal method of communicating across different Italian local languages and dialects. Despite the majority of today’s Italian population speaking Italian, hand gestures have persisted as a method of expression to accompany verbal speech in many regions of Italy, particularly in the Southern regions.

Around 250 specific hand gestures have been identified, with the belief that they developed during a period of occupation in which seven main groups are believed to have taken root in Italy: the Germanic tribes (Vandals, Ostrogoths and Lombards), the Moors, Normans, the French, Spaniards, and Austrians. Given that there was no common language, rudimentary sign language may have developed, forming the basis of modern-day hand gestures.

Historical background and development 

The precise origin of hand gestures as a popular component of Italian communication is still contested. De Jorio interprets the endurance of hand gestures in Southern Italy in particular as a cultural legacy of the Romans, who used the art of chironomia in everyday communication and in oratory.

The development of hand gestures is closely connected with the communicative phenomenon, and this non-verbal communication system cannot be formed within a short period. The early urbanization in Italy is believed to be the seed of capitalism there, which creates more opportunities for negotiations and bargains. The increasing demand of communication stimulates the wide use of hand gestures in Italy. In addition, the colonization stimulates the cultural fusion leading to the need of another language to communicate, hand gestures. According to research, Ancient Greek colonization along the Mediterranean coast including southern Italy can be traced back to the early eighth century BC.  After the fall of the Western Roman Empire, local language did not take a dominant position any longer, because of the arrival of new immigrants and colonizers from other regions of the world. The data indicates the seven main groups: the Carolingians, the Visigoths, the Normans, Saracens, the German tribes, French and Austrians. Additionally, Based on the extant funeral stone from the 5th century BC in the Pergamon Museum in Berlin, two soldiers were recorded with the moment of hands shaking. This is believed to be the proof of gestures in Ancient Greek which passed to and affected Italian non-verbal communication generation-to-generation even more than language. To the 21st century, around 250 hand gestures Italians use in everyday conversation have been identified.

The irreplaceable role of gesture in medieval societies especially in Renaissance is being acclaimed as the ‘une civilisation du geste’ by Jacques Le Goff. One reason that can explain the rich history of Italian hand gestures and one of them is about the cultural transmission and emotional expression during the period of Renaissance. Renaissance emphasized the restoration of human nature in the classical era with the aim of breaking the shackles of religion. At that time period, people have stronger willing to express themselves and attract the attention from other people with the aim of humanity liberation. By using hand gestures, they can gain a sense of satisfaction from delivering their thoughts. Therefore, Renaissance is a vial time point for the development of Italian hand gestures.

Hand gestures were extremely conspicuous in Italy during the early modern period. This may be due to the emergence of highly populated, large city states throughout Italy, such as Florence and Naples, in which people were compelled to take up greater space through their movements and expression in order to be understood. The higher usage of hand gestures in individuals living in, or raised in, Italian cities is still observable in a contemporary context.

Gesture frontier 
A ‘gesture frontier’ exists in Italy which separates the gestures used commonly in Southern Italy from those used in Northern Italy. This frontier is evident in the differing meaning of the 'chin flick' gesture. In Northern Italy, this gesture generally means 'get lost', whereas in Southern Italy it simply means 'no'. According to Morris, this is due to the ancient Greek colonisation of Southern Italy, as Greeks also use the 'chin flick' gesture to mean 'no'. A study conducted in central Italy proved this gesture frontier to be true; despite the mobility of the Italian population and the existence of nationwide media, the majority of the northern Roman population used the 'chin flick' with the Northern meaning, and the southern Neapolitan population used the Southern meaning.

This separation is evident between Northern and Southern Europe as well as within Italy, for instance speakers of English and Dutch generally use gesticulations considerably less in their speech than Italians and Greeks. The heavy use of gestures in communication has historically been considered an indication of a lack of civilisation in Southern European cultures by Northern Europeans.

Role of gestures in communication 
The continuation of hand gestures as a part of the Italian lexicon can be best understood as a form of cultural coding, as Italian children unconsciously imitate their parents and peers’ behaviours, causing them to develop gesticulating during conversation as an involuntary habit.

The use of hand gestures has always served a dual purpose in Italian culture; a substantive purpose which contributes expression to verbal communication and indicates emotion, and a pragmatic purpose which can serve as a substitute to verbal communication.

In a contemporary context, hand gestures are primarily used amongst Italians as a form of expression to accompany conversation rather than a substitute for verbal communication. The prevalence of hand gestures in communication in large Italian cities is thought to be due to competition, as individuals unconsciously wish to be more visible and take up more space in a busy urban setting by adding physical elements to their communication.

Communication vs. information

Communication 
Communicative postures would be named active postures, since it is given on purpose by individuals. For example, when a speaker is enthusiastic to deliver important information to his audience, he might tries to emphasis on hand gestures rather than the speech. A good example is about the picture of Uncle Sam, who is pointing his index finger directly towards you which is seen as a strong expression.

Information 
Informative gestures or passive postures refer to the hand movements that are not necessary or meaningful to the conversation, such as behaviors in scratching, adjusting clothing, and tapping. Since this part of gesture does not focus on communication, it usually does not involve extra verbal communication.

Classification of Italian hand gestures 

There are two main ways to classify the Italian hand gestures. The first way is to distinguish them via the occasions them used, such as religious rites, gladiatorial arenas and daily conversation. Another way is to differentiate the communicative and informative hand gestures in the Italian language system. These two types gestures might occur automatically, whereas informative-communicative dichotomy is used to explore the actual intention of them behind the conversation.

Religious rites 

In the oldest surviving Annunciation image, icons of the Annunciation, it can be found that the Archangel Gabriel is generally raised his hand before he started to mention something important. And this kind of gesture had been amply manifested by the behaviors of Roman rhetoricians when they were about to emphasise a key point. This tradition still affects the conversation of Italians beginning an exordium.

Gladiatorial arenas 

More recent research suggests that the use of thumb up and thumb down originates from Rome in the gladiatorial arenas, to decide the destiny of the loser in that fight. The loser may beg for mercy to the crowd, who would decide his fate by showing thumbs up or down. If he received more thumbs-up gestures than the thumbs-down, then the gladiator was to be spared. Thumbs down, on the other hand, signified execution. However, there is still a controversial around scholars about the exact meaning of thumb-up and thumb-down in ancient Rome.

Daily routine 
The habit of talking with one's hands in Italy has been reported to address and reinforce the meaning of expressions. An iconic symbol of Italian gesture is the movement of the hand with an up-down activity. Under normal conversation, gesturing helps in delivering the meaning and receiving information. For example, when an Italian is begging for a help, he would put his palms together with fingers extended and press.  Due to the difference in local context and cultural background, Italian has its own hand gestures system which might not always have the same use in different regions even for Northern and Southern regions.

Basic gestures 

The following section introduces some common and useful gestures used regularly in Italian conversation with words described.

 Che vuoi? - Finger purse/pinched fingers/🤌 (various meanings, often "what do you want/what do you mean"). Keep your fingers together, with tips touching and pointing upward. Arm is about a foot distance away from the body. Hands can move up and down at the wrist or be held.
 Please do me a favor - Put your palms devoutly (🙏) and press them in front of the chest.
 Excellent - Bunch ten fingers together and lift them to the same height as mouth. Then use hand to touch the lips.
 Perfect - The thumb and index finger form a circle, with the other three fingers extended (👌) and draw a straight vertical line or relaxed. Also called an OK gesture.
 Delicious - Put one index finger on the cheek or touch tips of all fingers of one hand together and kiss them while extending the arm away from the mouth.
 Think twice - Extend the index finger and point it to one side of the head.
 Watch out! - Using your index finger, tugging at your bottom eyelid.
 I swear - Form an X in front of the chest by using two index fingers.
 See you later - Use one index finger and extend it to draw a small circle in the air.
 Dramatic change - Place the palm facing downwards, then flip palm hand over to the facing upwards position.
 Let's go - With the palm facing inwards, flatten your fingers except thumb, after that shake hand in an up and down movements several times.
 Asking another person for a cigarette - Index and middle finger form a V shape pointing upwards, as the hand is brought towards and away from the mouth.
 The "chin flick" - Person quickly tips their heads backwards while tutting. In Southern Italy and other countries in the Mediterranean, means 'no'. In Northern Italy and other countries such as France, means 'get lost'.
 "Get lost" - The arm is outstretched, hand is flat. Wrist moves up and down. Used either ironically or maliciously.
 Indication of disbelief - heels of hands and fingertips are pressed together to form a round shape, hands move up and down.
 L'ombrello - The Umbrella - common profanity. One arm bends facing upwards, the other slaps the crook of the bent arm's elbow.
 I couldn't care less - The hand is cupped under the chin and wiggle outwards repeatedly.

Benefits 
The elaboration of hand and daily communication shows some advantages and the use of gestures help the Italian's expression more easy-understanding which is believed by psychologists. There are some reasons to explain that.

 Hand gestures reflect the thoughts inside speaker's mind

Hand gesture act as a proxy to turn intangible thoughts into hand movements presenting the idea in a direct way. Recently, more researches have improved that there is a link between the cognition and action. For instance, Broca's area a brain region functions an important role in speaking. In addition, this area is active at the same time when there is a hand movement.

 Gesturing helps understanding

Effective communication, notably teaching, is a central application of cognitive psychology. Explaining processes that occur over time is especially challenging, primarily because of the complexity of the sequence of actions and their causes and consequences. Adding gestures that are crafted to congruently represent the actions to the verbal explanation deepens understanding of the actions and the system as a whole. Gestures are especially effective because they can both resemble and represent and also embody action. As a consequence, gesturing is also regarded as a "second language". Italians use the hand movements in conjunction with their own language to convey the information, hence oral communication is supplemented by the gestures.

 Early hand gestures in childhood predicts a development for children

There is a conducted experiment based on the effects about hand gestures to children, it is found that hand gestures used at 14 months was an important indicator of the size of vocabulary at 42 months, significantly outweigh the vocabulary size of normal children who only affected by the parents and child words at 14 months. Not only for language system, early gesturing immersive environment has a potential effect on individual's personality. Until now there is not a supportable evidence to explain the relationship between gesturing habit and biological genes. Whereas, it is found that people who prefer to use gesturing during their conversation tend to be defined with warm, agreeable and energetic characteristic, while less animated speakers are relatively logical, cold and analytical.

References

External links
 Short Lexicon of Italian Gestures, by Gianni Cipriano

Hand gestures
Italian language